Doumea chappuisi is a species of loach catfish found in the coastal rivers of Guinea, Ivory Coast, Liberia and Guinea-Bissau.  It reaches a length of 11.4 cm.

The fish is named in honor of French-born Swiss zoologist and biospeleologist Pierre-Alfred Chappuis (1891-1960), who collected the type specimen.

References 

 

Amphiliidae
Freshwater fish of West Africa
Taxa named by Jacques Pellegrin
Fish described in 1933